Vohitrindry is a town and commune in Madagascar. It belongs to the district of Vohipeno, which is a part of Vatovavy-Fitovinany Region. The population of the commune was estimated to be approximately 13,000 in 2001 commune census.

Primary and junior level secondary education are available in town. The majority 98% of the population of the commune are farmers.  The most important crops are rice and coffee; also cassava is an important agricultural product. Services provide employment for 2% of the population.

References and notes 

Populated places in Vatovavy-Fitovinany